Her Royal Highness Princess Banchob Benchama or Phrachao Boromwong Ther Phra Ong Chao Banchob Benchama (5 November 1861 - 13 September 1892) was a Princess of Siam (later Thailand) and a member of the Siamese royal family. She was a daughter of King Mongkut and Chao Chom Manda Phae Dharmasaroja.

The princess' mother was Chao Chom Manda Pae Thamsaroj, who was the daughter of Phra Samran Haruethai (Uan Dharmasaroja) and Thao Songkandan (Si Dharmasaroja).

Early life 
Princess Banchob Benchama was born on 5 November 1861 at the Grand Palace. She was the couple's fifth child. Unfortunately as a result of her difficult birth her mother died the next day. Her full name as given by her father was "Phra Chao Borom Wong Ther Phra Ong Chao Banchob Banchama". Her name means the fifth and final child.

She had 4 siblings 2 elder sisters and 2 elder brothers:
 Princess Yingyaovalakshana
 Princess Bhaktrabimalabarna
 Prince Kashemsanta Sobhaga the Prince of Phromwaranurak
 Prince Manusyanagamanop (later Vajirananavarorasa)

Princess Banchob Benchama died on 24 September 1892 at the age 30.

Ancestry

References

Thai female Phra Ong Chao
19th-century Chakri dynasty
19th-century Thai women
1861 births
1892 deaths
People from Bangkok
Children of Mongkut
Daughters of kings